Ruthenium oxide may refer to either of the following:

Ruthenium(IV) oxide, RuO2
Ruthenium(VIII) oxide, RuO4